Daria Dmitrievna Beklemisheva (born 27 June 1997) is a Russian-Hungarian former competitive pair skater. Skating with Márk Magyar for Hungary, she won bronze at the 2017 Bavarian Open and competed at the 2017 World Championships.

Personal life 
Beklemisheva was born on 27 June 1997 in Lipetsk, Russia. She became a Hungarian citizen in August 2017. In July 2019 she married Russian figure skater Mikhail Kolyada.

Career

Early years 
Beklemisheva began learning to skate in 2002. Competing in partnership with Nikita Ermolaev, she placed 10th at the 2012 Russian Junior Championships. She skated with Yaroslav Maslov at the 2014 Russian Junior Championships, finishing 12th.

Partnership with Bobrov 
Representing Russia, Beklemisheva and Maxim Bobrov competed together at two ISU Junior Grand Prix (JGP) events in October 2014; after placing fourth in Dresden, Germany, they won silver in Zagreb, Croatia. The pair qualified to the JGP Final in Barcelona, Spain, where they finished fourth.

Ranked fifth at the 2015 Russian Junior Championships, they were nominated to compete at the 2015 World Junior Championships after the withdrawal of Maria Vigalova / Egor Zakroev. They placed 10th in the short program, 12th in the free skate, and 11th overall in Tallinn, Estonia. Artur Dmitriev coached the pair in Moscow.

Partnership with Magyar 
Around 2016, Beklemisheva teamed up with Márk Magyar to compete for Hungary on the senior level. Making their international debut, they won the bronze medal at the Bavarian Open in February 2017. In March, they placed 24th in the short program at the 2017 World Championships in Helsinki, Finland. Trudy Oltmanns coached the pair in Shakopee, Minnesota, until the end of the season.

For the 2017–2018 season, Beklemisheva/Magyar decided to train with Robin Szolkowy, Maylin Wende, and Daniel Wende in Oberstdorf, Germany, and Zurich, Switzerland. The pair placed 8th at the 2017 CS Lombardia Trophy and 16th at the 2017 CS Nebelhorn Trophy.

Programs

With Magyar

With Bobrov

Competitive highlights 
CS: Challenger Series; JGP: Junior Grand Prix

With Magyar for Hungary

With Ermolaev, Maslov, and Bobrov for Russia

References

External links 

 
 

1997 births
Living people
Hungarian female pair skaters
Russian female pair skaters
Sportspeople from Lipetsk
Naturalized citizens of Hungary